Olivier Chauzu (born 18 December 1963) is a Franco-Spanish classical pianist.

Biography 
Chauzu studied at the Conservatoire à rayonnement régional de Bordeaux, then at the Conservatoire de Paris in Gabriel Tacchino's class, then Théodore Paraskivesco's, as well as Jean-Claude Pennetier's and Christian Ivaldi's. After he won his two first prizes (piano and chamber music), he followed the cycle of perfection, worked with Dimitri Bashkirov, Leon Fleisher and began to perform in concerts in France and abroad. He went to Canada to study at the Banff Center with György Sebők, Paul Badura-Skoda, Anton Kuerti. The international Yvonne Lefébure competition followed by a prize at the Maria Canals International Competition immediately made him known as a performer of Debussy ("Much better than a good pianist, a real musician"), wrote Gérard Gefen in La Lettre du musicien nº 93). 
 
He obtained a doctorate in Spanish literature from the University of Pau and Pays de l'Adour, where he participated in the Romance Language Laboratory, and frequently gave Enrique Granados' Goyescas and Isaac Albéniz's suite Iberia in concert, for which he won the Diapason d'or. He then recorded Paul Dukas's complete music for piano, including the grand sonata in E-flat minor, Robert Schumann's (Humoresque, Davidsbündlertänze and Toccata) festival, then a recording dedicated to Beethoven's sonatas. Committed to contemporary creation, he also records Philippe Forget's cinq regards pour piano and Lucien Guérinel's trios. In Toronto (Canada), he premiered Fragments de soleil by Philippe Forget, as well as Pablo Neruda's poems by Omar Daniel.
 
He travels the world, Spain, France, Portugal, Czech Republic, Sweden, Germany, America, Middle, and Far East.

Discography 
 Isaac Albéniz, Iberia (2CD Calliope CAL 9398.9) 
 Paul Dukas' Complete work for piano: Piano Sonata, Variations Interlude et Finale, Prélude élégiaque, La plainte, au loin, du faune (Calliope).
 Schumann's Toccata, Davidsbündlertänze, Humoreske (Calliope).
 Beethoven's sonata Op 101 and 106 (Calliope).
 Schumann's piano sonatas (2013, Azur Classical) 
 Samazeuilh's work for piano (21–23 February 2014, Grand Piano) 
 Debussy, Music for piano with four hands - with Jean-Pierre Armengaud (March/July 2012, Naxos 8.572979).
 Chausson and Cras, Trios for piano, violin, cello - Trio des Aulnes: Jean-François Corvaisier, violin; Laurent Lagarde, cello; Olivier Chauzu, piano (21-24 February 1998, Euromuses) 
 Mendelssohn's Trios for piano, violin, cello - Trio des Aulnes (Euromuses) 
 Guérinel's Trios nº1 and 2 (Integral Classic). 
 Forget's chamber music: Canaa et Cinq regards pour piano (27 June 2008, Anima Records ANM/090600001) 
 Schumann's Variations on a theme by Beethoven, Geistervariationen, Variations on a theme by Schubert (15 May 2015, Naxos 8.573540).
 Kalomíris's works for piano (2-3 November 2016, Grand Piano).

References

External links 
 Olivier Chazu (ResMusica)
 Olivier Chazu, pianist (Radio Classique)
 Olivier Chazu (Académie de Pâques)
 Debussy à quatre mains par Jean-Pierre Armengaud et Olivier Chauzu
 Official website
 Biography on pianobleu.com
 Olivier Chazu (Naxos)
 Olivier Chazu's biography
 Olivier Chauzu / Concerto N° 2 Saint Saens (1st mvt) (YouTube)

 	

1963 births
Living people
21st-century French male classical pianists
Spanish classical pianists
Conservatoire de Bordeaux alumni
Conservatoire de Paris alumni
20th-century French male classical pianists
Spanish male musicians